Mikel Arce Hualde (born 15 June 1984) is a Spanish former footballer who played as a forward.

Club career

Early years
Arce was born in Pamplona, Navarre. After graduating from CA Osasuna's youth academy he spent the entirety of his Spanish career in the lower leagues; he appeared only once in the Segunda División B, as a second-half substitute in SD Lemona's 3–0 away win against Marino de Luanco.

In the 2007–08 season, Arce scored 20 Tercera División goals for CD Lourdes. Subsequently, he signed for Major League Soccer side San Jose Earthquakes.

Paraguay
In the following transfer window, Arce he moved teams and countries again, joining 12 de Octubre Football Club for whom he featured in the Paraguayan Primera División as the first Spaniard ever in the competition following the creation of the Paraguayan Football Association. Previously, he had a trial with Olimpia Asunción in the same country.

Arce said of his spell in Paraguay, compared to that of the United States, that he thought he would have an easier time adapting because he spoke the same language as the natives. However, he found that the challenge of learning Guarani was the equivalent of switching from Spanish to Basque in his homeland.

Later career
In the summer of 2009, Arce returned to Spain and resumed his career in the lower divisions and amateur football.

Personal life
In October 2012, in a Beauty King and Queen contest held in Villarrobledo, Arce finished in third position, being elected Best Spanish Body in the process.

References

External links

1984 births
Living people
Spanish footballers
Footballers from Pamplona
Association football forwards
Segunda División B players
Tercera División players
Divisiones Regionales de Fútbol players
Real Sociedad B footballers
CD Numancia B players
CD Logroñés footballers
SD Lemona footballers
CD Calahorra players
CE Constància players
Lorca Deportiva CF footballers
San Jose Earthquakes players
Paraguayan Primera División players
12 de Octubre Football Club players
Spanish expatriate footballers
Expatriate soccer players in the United States
Expatriate footballers in Paraguay
Spanish expatriate sportspeople in the United States
Spanish expatriate sportspeople in Paraguay